This list is not comprehensive, as not all Strigiformes have had their numbers quantified. For a simple list of all owl species, see the article "List of owl species".

Species by global population

See also
 
Lists of birds by population
Lists of organisms by population

References

.
Strigiformes